Kristján Gíslason (born 16 April 1956) is an Icelandic adventurer, writer, documentary filmmaker and former businessman. He attracted national attention in Iceland for his 10-month journey around the globe on motorcycle in 2014 and 2015 and subsequent travels, gaining the nickname Hringfarinn. Documentaries about his travels have been featured on the Icelandic state channel RÚV.

Career 
Kristján graduated from Menntaskólinn við Hamrahlíð in 1976. He worked as a programmer and a systems analyst for Samband íslenskra samvinnufélaga (SÍS) from 1976 to 1985 and later ran his own company, Radíómiðun, which specialized in maritime telecommunications, fish-finding equipment and navigation systems for the fishing fleet, from 1985 to 2013.

Travels 
With his father's encouraging words: “Never stop daring!“ in mind, he set out to plan a 3-month-long motorcycle tour around the world in 2014, at the age of 58. Originally planning to ride with other motorcyclists, he ended up riding solo across the globe – and the trip lasted 10 months instead of three. Kristján rode almost 48,000 km (close to 30,000 miles) through 35 countries on five continents.

Personal life
Kristján is married to Ásdís Rósa Baldursdóttir. They have three sons: Gísli (1981), Baldur (1983), and Árni (1989), and 5 grandchildren.

Bibliography

Travel books
2018: Hringfarinn - Einn á hjóli í hnattferð
2021: Andlit Afríku

Filmography

Documentaries
2019: Hringfarinn – í kringum hnöttinn á mótorhjóli. A three part documentary broadcast on RÚV in January–February 2019. 
2020: Hringfarinn – touring the US and crossing Europe from Iceland to Russia. Broadcast on RÚV in 2019. 
2022: Hringfarinn – the Africa Journey. Broadcast on RÚV in March–April 2022.

References 

Living people
1956 births
Kristjan Gislason
Kristjan Gislason
Kristjan Gislason